Homorhynchus (Greek for "same snout") is a genus of prehistoric fish from the Eocene and Oligocene.

It was described by Edouard Van Beneden in 1873.

References
Homorhynchus, Paleobiology Database

Acanthomorpha
Eocene fish
Oligocene fish